Malcolm Norval (born 24 September 1967) is a Scottish former rugby union player who played for Glasgow Rugby, now Glasgow Warriors at the Lock position.

Rugby Union career

Amateur career

Norval played for amateur club side Stirling County.

On leaving Glasgow Norval continued to play for Stirling County but gradually it was a club that began a downward slide however in 2001 there were tipped for promotion back into the BT Premiership. A crop of talented youngsters emerged in the team. No fewer than six players were capped by Scotland at Under 19 or Under 21 age grades. By 2002, they began as if were challenging for the Premiership again. Norval was still in the side as a veteran. Their charge fizzled out at the end of the season and they ended up staving off relegation.

In 2005 Norval played as one of Rugby Ecosse Legends against Fife in an Andy Kerr memorial match, a dual code match for the Fife Lions rugby league star that died after an epileptic seizure.

Provincial and professional career

He was part of a winning Stirling County team that had up to seven players in the Glasgow District team.

He played in the European Conference, now European Challenge Cup, for Glasgow. As the Lock named for Warriors first match as a professional team - against Newbridge in the European Challenge Cup - Norval has the distinction of being given Glasgow Warrior No. 5 for the provincial side.

International career

Norval was capped for Scotland A.

References

External links 
 Glasgow District v North & Midlands 1992
 Glasgow District v Munster 1992
 Glasgow District v South 1995
 Glasgow District v North & Midlands 1996
 Watsonians v Stirling County 1994
Stirling County v  Edinburgh Academicals 1994
Edinburgh Academicals v Stirling County 1995
Stirling County v Melrose 1995
 Stirling County v Aberdeen GSFP 2000

1967 births
Living people
Place of birth missing (living people)
Glasgow Warriors players
Stirling County RFC players
Glasgow District (rugby union) players
Scotland 'A' international rugby union players
Rugby union locks